Pojezerje is a municipality of Dubrovnik-Neretva County in the southwest of Croatia. It has a population of 1,223 (census 2001), in which absolute majority are Croats (98%).

Villages
Mali Prolog

References

Municipalities of Croatia
Populated places in Dubrovnik-Neretva County